A rite of passage is a ritual that marks a change in a person's social or sexual status.

Rite(s) of passage may also refer to:

Arts, entertainment, and media

Films
 Rites of Passage, a 1983 short film by Richard Stanley
 Rites of Passage (1999 film), a thriller starring Dean Stockwell
 Rites of Passage (2012 film), a thriller starring Wes Bentley
 Rites of Passage: The Rebirth of Combat Sports, a 2001 MMA documentary produced by Frederico Lapenda

Literature 
 Rite of Passage (novel), a 1968 novel by Alexei Panshin
 Rite of Passage, a 1956 short fiction by Henry Kuttner and C. L. Moore
 Rite of Passage, a 1994 posthumously published novel by Richard Wright
 Rites of Passage (novel), a 1980 novel by William Golding and first part of the trilogy To the Ends of the Earth

Music

Albums
 Rites of Passage (Brother Ali album), 2000
 Rites of Passage (Roger Hodgson album), 1996
 Rites of Passage (Indigo Girls album), 1992
 Rites of Passage, the 1985 debut album of British band Vitamin Z

Other uses in music
 Rites of Passage (Sculthorpe), a 1972–73 music theatre work by Peter Sculthorpe
 "Rites of Passage", a song by Yanni from Ethnicity
 "A Rite of Passage", a song by Dream Theater from Black Clouds & Silver Linings

Television 
 "Rite of Passage" (Stargate SG-1)
 "Rite of Passage" (The Outer Limits)
 "Rites of Passage" (Dead Like Me)
 "Rites of Passage" (Goodnight Sweetheart)
 "Rites of Passage" (Married... with Children)
 "Rites of Passage" (Miami Vice)
 "Rites of Passage" (Superboy)
 "Rites of Passage" (Vikings)

Other uses in arts, entertainment, and media
 Rites of Passage (magazine), later the Transsexual News Telegraph, a 1991-2002 periodical covering issues related to transsexuality

Other uses 
 Rite of Passage (horse) (foaled 2004), a Thoroughbred racehorse
 Rites of Passage (educational program), an educational program on African American history

See also 
 "My Rite of Passage", an episode of the TV series Scrubs
 Right of passage, a maritime right to traverse an inner waterway
 Rite (disambiguation)